Saint John the Evangelist's Catholic Church may refer to:
 Church of St John the Evangelist, Liège, Belgium
 San Giovanni Evangelista, Ravenna, Italy
 St. John the Evangelist Catholic Church (Frederick, Maryland), U.S.
 St. John the Evangelist Catholic Church (Silver Spring, Maryland), U.S.
 St. John the Evangelist Catholic Church (Philadelphia, Pennsylvania), U.S.

See also 
 St. John the Baptist Church (disambiguation)
 St. John's Cathedral (disambiguation)
 St. John's Church (disambiguation)